Popol Vuh were a German musical collective founded by keyboardist Florian Fricke in 1969 together with Frank Fiedler (sound design, fine cut), Holger Trülzsch (percussion), and Bettina Fricke (tablas and production). Other important members during the next two decades included Djong Yun, Renate Knaup, Conny Veit, Daniel Fichelscher, Klaus Wiese, and Robert Eliscu. The band took its name from the Mayan manuscript containing the mythology of highland Guatemala's K'iche' people.

Popol Vuh began as an electronic music project, but under Fricke's leadership they soon abandoned synthesizers for organic instrumentation and world music influences. They developed a productive working partnership with director Werner Herzog, contributing scores to films such as Aguirre, The Wrath of God (1972), Nosferatu the Vampyre (1979), and Fitzcarraldo (1982). The group are associated with West Germany's 1970s krautrock movement and are considered progenitors of new-age and ambient music. Today, Popol Vuh's best-reviewed works are In den Gärten Pharaos (1971) and Hosianna Mantra (1972).

History

The band's name, taken from the Mayan manuscript, has been translated roughly as "meeting place" or "book of the community". Their first album, Affenstunde, released in 1970, can be regarded as one of the earliest space music works, featuring the then new sounds of the Moog synthesizer together with ethnic percussion. This continued for only one more album, In den Gärten Pharaos, and material later to be released on the soundtrack to Aguirre, the Wrath of God, before Fricke largely abandoned electronic instruments in favour of piano-led compositions from 1972's Hosianna Mantra forward. This album also marked the start of exploring overtly religious themes rather than a more generally spiritual feeling within the music. The group evolved to include a range of instruments: wind and strings, electric and acoustic alike, combined to convey a mystical aura that made their music spiritual and introspective.

Popol Vuh influenced many other European bands with their uniquely soft but elaborate instrumentation, which took inspiration from the music of Tibet, Africa, and pre-Columbian America. With music sometimes described as "ethereal", they created soundscapes through psychedelic walls of sound, and are regarded as precursors of contemporary world music, as well as of new age and ambient.

The band contributed soundtracks to films of Werner Herzog, including the aforementioned Aguirre, the Wrath of God, as well as Nosferatu, Fitzcarraldo, Cobra Verde, Heart of Glass and The Enigma of Kaspar Hauser, in which Fricke appeared.

Florian Fricke died in Munich on 29 December 2001 and the group disbanded.

In October 2003 Klaus Schulze wrote:
"Florian was and remains an important forerunner of contemporary ethnic and religious music. He chose electronic music and his big Moog to free himself from the restraints of traditional music, but soon discovered that he didn't get a lot out of it and opted for the acoustic path instead. Here, he went on to create a new world, which Werner Herzog loves so much, transforming the thought patterns of electronic music into the language of acoustic ethno music."

Discography

Affenstunde (1970)
In den Gärten Pharaos (1971)
Hosianna Mantra (1972)
Seligpreisung (1973)
Einsjäger und Siebenjäger (1974)
Das Hohelied Salomos (1975)
Aguirre (1975)
Letzte Tage – Letzte Nächte (1976)
Herz aus Glas (1977)
Brüder des Schattens – Söhne des Lichts (1978)
Nosferatu (1978)
Die Nacht der Seele (1979)
Sei still, wisse ICH BIN (1981)
Agape – Agape (1983)
Spirit of Peace (1985)
Cobra Verde (1987)
For You and Me (1991)
City Raga (1995)
Shepherd's Symphony – Hirtensymphonie (1997)
Messa di Orfeo (1999)

Florian Fricke solo albums

Die Erde und ich sind Eins (1983) – limited private pressing
Florian Fricke Plays Mozart (1992) – featuring Fricke on piano playing Mozart compositions

Compilations

Note: there are two distinct issues of the compilation Best of Popol Vuh – Werner Herzog. These are distinct from The Best Soundtracks from Werner Herzog Films, though the selections of tracks overlap.

Perlenklänge: The Best of Popol Vuh (1976) – Ohr / Pilz / Kosmische Musik compilation
Tantric Songs (1981) – featuring tracks from Die Nacht der Seele and Brüder des Schattens – Söhne des Lichts
Fitzcarraldo (1982) – soundtrack featuring four previously released Popol Vuh compositions besides opera and traditional music
In the Gardens of Pharao / Aguirre (1983)
Gesang der Gesänge (1988)
Best of Popol Vuh – Werner Herzog (1989 with 14 tracks; reissued 1993 with only 10 tracks)
Florian Fricke (1991) – featuring tracks from Herz aus Glas (retitled) and Brüder des Schattens – Söhne des Lichts
The Best Soundtracks from Werner Herzog Films (1991, 8 tracks)
Best of Popol Vuh from the Films of Werner Herzog (1992, 10 tracks), contains one track (titled "We Are Aware of the Misery") from the Herzog film The Dark Glow of the Mountains, which was previously unreleased
Sing, for Song Drives Away the Wolves (1993) – remix album
Movie Music (1994) – 3-CD set: Aguirre, Herz aus Glas, Nosferatu
Nicht Hoch Im Himmel (1998)
Future Sound Experience (2002) – remix album recorded in 1993 (according to its booklet) and released after Florian Fricke's death
70's Progressive (2006) – SPV compilation
On the Way to Himalaya (2006) – 3-CD set: Brüder des Schattens – Söhne des Lichts, Spirit of Peace, Die Nacht der Seele
The Werner Herzog Soundtracks Box set (2011)
Revisited & Remixed (1970–1999) (2011)

Unauthorized album
Yoga (1976) – recorded by Florian Fricke with Indian musicians

References

External links
Perfect Sound Forever: Popul Vuh- an extensive look at their catalog (Comprehensive article & review of every album, in English)
Popol Vuh & Florian Fricke Popol Vuh & Florian Fricke. The ultimate resource: biography, discography, movies, collaborations, web links and foto gallery.

German electronic music groups
Krautrock musical groups
Musical groups established in 1969
Musical groups disestablished in 2001
Brain Records artists